Diving is a part of the Asian Games since the first edition of the continental sports event in 1951, when New Delhi hosted the Games.

Editions

Events

Medal table

List of medalists

References

 Medallists from previous Asian Games – Diving

External links
Asian Games medalists 

 
Sports at the Asian Games
Asian Games